Ramiro Leone (born 1 June 1977 in Rosario) is an Argentine football midfielder who plays for All Boys.

Career
Leone began his playing career in the Argentine 2nd division in 1994 with Central Córdoba. Between 1996 and 2000 he played for Gimnasia y Tiro de Salta. He had a loan spell with Mexican side F.C. Atlas in 1997, but returned to play for GyT in the Primera División in 1998.

In 2000, he returned to Central Córdoba before a second stint with Gimnasia y Tiro between 2001 and 2002, this time in the regionalised 3rd division.

In 2002 Leone returned to the 2nd tier playing for Argentinos Juniors until 2004, he then had one year stints with Nueva Chicago, El Porvenir and Chacarita Juniors before joining San Martín de Tucumán in 2007. He was part of the squad that won the Primera B Nacional championship in 2007-08 and promotion to the Primera División.

Leone played one season in the Primera with San Martín before their relegation at the end of the season. During the winter 2009 transfer window he joined Club Atlético Tigre.

Titles

External links
 ESPN statistics
 BDFA profile
 Primera División statistics at Futbol XXI
Profile at Tigre 

1977 births
Living people
Footballers from Rosario, Santa Fe
Argentine footballers
Association football midfielders
Central Córdoba de Rosario footballers
Argentinos Juniors footballers
Nueva Chicago footballers
Chacarita Juniors footballers
San Martín de Tucumán footballers
Club Atlético Tigre footballers
Atlas F.C. footballers
Argentine Primera División players
Expatriate footballers in Mexico